Eita is a settlement in Kiribati.  It is located on an atoll in South Tarawa.

References

Populated places in Kiribati
Tarawa